Awa Manneh (born 7 January 1982) is a Swedish R&B/soul singer. She has been the lead singer of the music group Blacknuss. As a solo singer she is known for the songs All yours, "Hip Hop Ballad", "Behind Schedule" and "Say a little prayer". The song All yours she made along with Thomas Rusiak.

In 2003, she was voted "Sexiest Swedish woman of the year" by QX.

Personal life
Born in Sweden, Manneh is of Gambian descent.

References

Living people
1982 births
Swedish people of Gambian descent
20th-century Swedish women singers
21st-century Swedish women singers
English-language singers from Sweden